Clooney is a surname. Notable people with the surname include:
Amal Clooney (née Alamuddin) (born 1978), Lebanese-British lawyer and wife of George Clooney
Francis Xavier Clooney (born 1950), American academic and Roman Catholic priest
George Clooney (born 1961), American actor
Nick Clooney (born 1934), American TV host and journalist, father of George
Rosemary Clooney (1928–2002), American singer and actress, aunt of George